Grindley Brook Halt was a railway halt in the village of Grindley Brook, Shropshire on the Whitchurch and Tattenhall Railway or Chester-Whitchurch Branch Line.  Nearby the line crossed the Shropshire Union Canal and the A41. It was open between 1937 and 1957.

Services

References

External links
 Grindley Brook Halt station on Subterranea Britannica

Disused railway stations in Cheshire
Former London, Midland and Scottish Railway stations
Railway stations in Great Britain opened in 1937
Railway stations in Great Britain closed in 1957
Whitchurch, Shropshire
1937 establishments in England
1957 disestablishments in England